Douglas Alexander Allan, CBE, FRSGS, FRSE, FMA (28 January 1896 – 30 July 1967) was a geologist and curator, eventually becoming the director of the Royal Scottish Museum in Edinburgh, from 1945 until 1961.

Early life
Born in Edinburgh in 1896 and the son of James Allan and Agnes Annie Logan, Douglas Allan was educated at George Watson's College and Boroughmuir Student Centre before going on to serve throughout World War I at the Department of Explosives Supply, Ministry of Munitions and the Royal Field Artillery.  He graduated from the University of Edinburgh with BScs in Geology and Chemistry in 1921 and furthered his education with a PhD from the same University in 1923  and a DSc in 1927. Allan took part in the William Speirs Bruce expeditions to Spitsbergen from 1919 to 1921 and worked as an assistant in the Department of Geology under T. J. Jehu from 1921 to 1925.

Career
He started working as a lecturer at Armstrong College, University of Durham from 1925 to 1929 and was elected as a fellow of the Royal Society of Edinburgh in 1927, having been proposed by Thomas James Jehu, Robert Campbell, John Horne, George Walter Tyrrell, going on to serve as a councillor from 1955 to 1958.  In 1929, Allan became the Director of Liverpool Public Museums and stayed in this job until 1945, when he became the Director of the Royal Scottish Museum until his retirement in 1961.

Douglas Allan took an active role in his field and was chairman of the Museums Association and a member of the Post-War Reconstruction Committee on Museums and Art Galleries.  He was the Vice-President of the Royal Scottish Geographical Society from 1948 until his death in 1967, serving as President from 1954 to 1958.  The Royal Society of Edinburgh awarded him their Neill Prize in 1941 for his papers on "The Geology of the Highland Border."

Works

References

1896 births
1967 deaths
People educated at George Watson's College
Scottish curators
Alumni of the University of Edinburgh
Scottish explorers
Scottish scholars and academics
Academics of the University of Edinburgh
Commanders of the Order of the British Empire
Fellows of the Royal Society of Edinburgh
Presidents of the Royal Scottish Geographical Society
Scottish biographers
Scottish geologists
Royal Field Artillery officers
People educated at Boroughmuir High School